Gombazun (also Romanized as Gombazūn and Gambāzoon; also known as Do Gombazūn, Dow Gombazūn, Gambarān, and Gombazān) is a village in Jarahi Rural District, in the Central District of Mahshahr County, Khuzestan Province, Iran. At the 2006 census, its population was 447, in 83 families.

References 

Populated places in Mahshahr County